Xylotumulus is a genus of fungi in the family Xylariaceae.

References

External links 
 Index Fungorum

Xylariales